In Greek mythology, Brangas was a Thracian prince as son of King Strymon, and the brother of Rhesus and Olynthus.

Mythology 
Rhesus was killed by Diomedes while fighting for the Trojans in the Trojan War. When Olynthus was killed during the chase by a lion, Brangas buried him on the spot where he had fallen, and called the town which he subsequently founded Olynthus. The story of Brangas appears only in Conon, who, unfortunately, lists no sources.

Notes

References 

 Conon, Fifty Narrations, surviving as one-paragraph summaries in the Bibliotheca (Library) of Photius, Patriarch of Constantinople translated from the Greek by Brady Kiesling. Online version at the Topos Text Project.
 Stephanus of Byzantium, Stephani Byzantii Ethnicorum quae supersunt, edited by August Meineike (1790-1870), published 1849. A few entries from this important ancient handbook of place names have been translated by Brady Kiesling. Online version at the Topos Text Project.

Children of Potamoi
Thracian characters in Greek mythology
Thraco-Macedonian mythology